Neergaard is a Danish noble family descended from War Councillor Peter Johansen Neergaard, whose two sons Jens Bruun Neergaard (1742–1788) and Johan Thomas Neergaard (1745–1806) were ennobled on 2 May 1788. The descendants of Jens Bruun Neergaard are referred to as the "elder branch" and the descendants of Johan Thomas Neergaard are referred to as the "younger branch".

Jens Bruun de Neergaard branch
Jens Bruun Neergaard took over Svenstrup after his father in 1763. He married Ane Marie Møller (23 March 1743 – 23 October 1802). They had four children:
 Jens Peter Bruun de Neergaard (7 December 1764 – 7 January 1848)
 Johan Andreas Bruun de Neergaard (4 August 1770 – 2 July 1846)
 Tønnes Christian Bruun de Neergaard (26 November 1776 – 14 January 1824)
 Ellen Cathrine Kirstine Bruun de Neergaard (19 July 1778 – 19 July 1845)

Johan Thomas Neergaard branch

Johan Thomas Neergaard inherited Ringsted Kloster. He married Anna Joachimine Qvistgaard (19 August 1750 – 5 January 1829). They had 11 children:
 Peter Johansen de Neergaard (24 July 1769 – 9 January 1835)
 Marie de Neergaard (January 1770 – ?)
 Lucia Kirstine de Neergaard (5 February 1773 – 9 November 1817)
 Jørgen de Neergaard (29 July 1775 – 27 February 1795)
 Johan Michael de Neergaard (16 November 1776 – 26 July 1783)
 Jacob de Neergaard (24 April 1778 – 19 October 1833)
 Johanne Birgitte de Neergaard (1780 – 1790)
 Mette Dorothea de Neergaard (1781 –1782)
 Johan Michael de Neergaard (11 January 1784 – 9 August 1837)
 Marie Christine Jacobæa Elisabeth de Neergaard (19 December 1789 – 21 August 1859)
 Johanne (Hanne) Birgitte Mette Dorothea de Neergaard (29 March 1792 – 5 June 1824)

Insignia
The family's coat of arms features three ears of wheat penetrating a golden crown on a blue shield on which a laurel wreath is casually arranged; above the shield a helmet with a golden crown resting a braided wreath in blue and gold.

Property
The de Neergaard family has been a major landowner, especially in the eastern part of Denmark, for generations. Estates that are currently owned by family members include: Svenstrup (since 1751), Gunderslevholm (since 1793), Gyldenholm Manor (since 1862) and Løvegård (since 1963).

Estates that have been owned by members of the family for several generations include: Kærup (1711–1804), Ringsted Abbey, Skjoldnæseholm, Fuglsang Manor (1819–1947), and Tybjerggård.

Estates that have been owned by members of the family more briefly include: Tølløsegård, Bonderup, Meerløse, and Rønnebæksholm.

Notable family members
 Bodil Neergaard (1867–1959), philanthropist and memoirist
 Joachim de Neergaard (1877–1920), composer
 Mette de Neergaard (born 1991), curler

References

External links
 Foreningen af den gunderslevholmske gren af slægten Neergaard

 
Danish noble families
1780 establishments in Denmark